Stolidoptera is a genus of moths in the family Sphingidae. The genus was discovered by Walter Rothschild and Karl Jordan in 1903.

Species
Stolidoptera cadioui Haxaire, 1997
Stolidoptera tachasara (H. Druce, 1888)

References

Dilophonotini
Moth genera
Taxa named by Walter Rothschild
Taxa named by Karl Jordan